Santalum album, or Indian sandalwood, is a small tropical tree, and the traditional source of sandalwood oil. It is native to southern India and Southeast Asia. It is considered sacred in some religions like Hinduism, and some cultures place great significance on its fragrant qualities. However, the high value of the species has caused over-exploitation, to the point where the wild population is vulnerable to extinction. Indian sandalwood still commands high prices for its essential oil owing to its high alpha santalol content, but due to lack of sizable trees it is no longer used for fine woodworking as before.  The plant is long-lived, but harvest is only viable after many years.

Description

The tree is variable in habit, usually upright to sprawling, and may intertwine with other species. The plant parasitises the roots of other tree species, with a haustorium adaptation on its own roots, but without major detriment to its hosts. An individual will form a non-obligate relationship with a number of other plants. Up to 300 species (including its own) can host the tree's development - supplying macronutrients phosphorus, nitrogen and potassium, and shade - especially during early phases of development. It may propagate itself through wood suckering during its early development, establishing small stands. The reddish or brown bark can be almost black and is smooth in young trees, becoming cracked with a red reveal. The heartwood is pale green to white as the common name indicates. The leaves are thin, opposite and ovate to lanceolate in shape. Glabrous surface is shiny and bright green, with a glaucous pale reverse. Fruit is produced after three years, viable seeds after five. These seeds are distributed by birds.

Taxonomy

History 

Santalum album has been known for four thousand years by its Sanskrit name chandana. The first extraction of its essential oil occurred in Mysore, India in 1917. For many years, the oils were extracted in the perfumeries at Grasse, France. Production is now controlled by the Indian state, and demand exceeds supply.

Nomenclature 

The nomenclature for other "sandalwoods" and the taxonomy of the genus are derived from this species' historical and widespread use. Etymologically it is derived from Sanskrit chandanam, meaning "wood for burning incense", and related to candrah, meaning "shining, glowing".

Santalum album is included in the family Santalaceae, and is commonly known as white or East Indian sandalwood. The name, Santalum ovatum, used by Robert Brown in Prodromus Florae Novae Hollandiae (1810) was described as a synonym of this species by Alex George in 1984. The epithet album refers to the "white" of the heartwood.

The species was the first to be known as sandalwood. Other species in the genus Santalum, such as the Australian S. spicatum, are also referred to as true sandalwoods, to distinguish them from trees with similar-smelling wood or oil.

Phytochemistry 

Sandalwood oil consists of about 80% α-santalol and β-santolol, predominantly the former, which are sesquiterpenes. Attempts to synthesise these date to 1947 by Givaudan in Switzerland. The resulting isobornyl cyclohexanol can be distinguished from santolol, but is muich cheaper. Since then other synthetic sandalwood oils have been used in laundry detergents and textiles.  Three of the terpene synthase genes producing components employed in host defense are present in S. album.

Distribution
Santalum album is indigenous to the tropical belt of the peninsular India, eastern Indonesia and northern Australia. The main distribution is in the drier tropical regions of India and the Indonesian islands of Timor and Sumba. There is still debate as to whether S. album is native to Australia and India or was introduced by fishermen, traders or birds from southeast Asia centuries ago.

Sandalwood is now cultivated in India, Sri Lanka, Indonesia, Malaysia, the Philippines and Northern Australia.

Habitat and growth

S. album occurs from coastal dry forests up to  elevation. It normally grows in sandy or well drained stony red soils, but a wide range of soil types are inhabited. S. album can grow up to  vertically. It should be planted in good sunlight and does not require a lot of water. The tree starts to flower after 7 years. When the tree is still young the flowers are white and with age they turn red or orange. The trunk of the tree starts to develop its fragrance after about 10 years of growth, but is not ready to harvest till after 20. The tree rarely lives more than 100 years.

Conservation
S. album is recognized as a "vulnerable" species by the International Union for the Conservation of Nature (IUCN). It is threatened by over-exploitation and degradation to habitat through altered land use, fire (to which this species is extremely sensitive), Spike disease, agriculture, and land-clearing are the factors of most concern. To preserve this vulnerable resource from over-exploitation, legislation protects the species, and cultivation is researched and developed.

Until 2002, individuals in India were not allowed to grow sandalwood. Due to its scarcity, sandalwood is not allowed to be cut or harvested by individuals. The State grants specific permission to officials who then can cut down the tree and sell its wood. The Indian government has placed a ban on the export of the timber.

Uses and production

S. album has been the primary source of sandalwood and the derived oil. These often hold an important place within the societies of its naturalised distribution range. The central part of the tree, the heartwood, is the only part of the tree that is used for its fragrance. It is yellow-brown in color, hard with an oily texture and due to its durability, is the perfect material for carving. The outer part of the tree, the sapwood, is unscented. The sapwood is white or yellow in color and is used to make turnery items. The high value of sandalwood has led to attempts at cultivation, this has increased the distribution range of the plant. It was valued in construction, since it was considered rotproof. 

The ISO Standard for the accepted characteristics of this essential oil is ISO 3518:2002.  HPTLC and GC, GC-MS based methods are used for qualitative and quantitative analyses of the volatile  essential oil constituents.

Indian sandalwood has a high santalol content, at about 90%, compared with the other main source of the oil, the cheaper Santalum spicatum (Australian sandalwood), at around 39%, and India used to dominate production of sandalwood oil world-wide, but the industry has been in decline in the 21st century. Another source is Santalum austrocaledonicum from New Caledonia. Sandalwood is used in the production of the perfume Samsara by Guerlain (1989).

The long maturation period and difficulty in cultivation have restricted extensive planting. Harvest of the tree involves several curing and processing stages, also adding to the commercial value. The wood and oil are in high demand and are an important trade item in three main regions:

India

The use of S. album in India is noted in literature for over two thousand years. It has use as wood and oil in religious practices, and was burned in cremation. In modern times only a small fragment is added to the pyre for symbolic purposes. It also features as a construction material in temples and elsewhere. The Indian government has banned the export of the species to reduce the threat by over-harvesting. In the southern Indian states of Karnataka, Andhra Pradesh, and Tamil Nadu all trees of greater than a specified girth were the property of the state until 2001/2.  Cutting of trees, even on private property, was regulated by the Forest Department. After that, they were allowed to be sold to private growers, but the product can only be sold to the state forest department. Annual production fell from a high of 4,000 tonnes in the early 1970s, to fewer than 300 tonnes in 2011. The decline is blamed on government policy and over-exploitation, and moves have been made to encourage planters to grow the trees again.

Australia
The native species, Santalum spicatum, is more common and extensively grown in Western Australia, but  there are two commercial Indian sandalwood plantations in full operation based in Kununurra, in the far north of Western Australia: Quintis (formerly Tropical Forestry Services), which in 2017 controlled around 80 per cent of the world's supply of Indian sandalwood, and Santanol.

Sri Lanka
The harvesting of sandalwood is preferred to be of trees that are advanced in age. Saleable wood can, however, be of trees as young as seven years. The entire plant is removed rather than cut to the base, as in coppiced species.  The extensive removal of S. album over the past century led to increased vulnerability to extinction.

, small plantations of Indian sandalwood also exist in China, Indonesia, Malaysia, the Philippines and the Pacific Islands.

China 

Sandalwood has been used over a longtime in China for the construction of statues and temples, and was burned in censers during religious rites.

Egypt 

Sandalwood was used for embalming mummies, and later was burned as part of  Muslim funerals.

See also
 Sandal spike phytoplasma - disease of S. album

References

Bibliography 

album
Flora of India (region)
Flora of Bangladesh
Essential oils
Vulnerable plants
Plants described in 1753
Taxa named by Carl Linnaeus